Felvizumab is a humanized monoclonal antibody against respiratory syncytial virus.

References

Monoclonal antibodies
Experimental drugs